The 1984 CART PPG Indy Car World Series season, the sixth in the CART era of U.S. open-wheel racing, consisted of 16 races,  beginning in Long Beach, California on March 31 and concluding in Las Vegas, Nevada on November 10.  The PPG Indy Car World Series Drivers' Champion was Mario Andretti and the Indianapolis 500 winner was Rick Mears.  Rookie of the Year was Roberto Guerrero. The 68th Indianapolis 500 was sanctioned by the USAC, but counted in the CART points standings.

Drivers and constructors 
The following teams and drivers competed for the 1984 PPG Indy Car World Series. Number in parenthesis is the number used at Indianapolis only.

Season Summary

Schedule 
This season featured a new oval in Canada called Sanair Super Speedway. Other changes included new street circuit races at the Meadowlands Sports Complex, and in Long Beach, California. Also added was a new permanent road course race at Portland International Raceway. Leaving the schedule was Riverside International Raceway and Atlanta Motor Speedway.

 Oval/Speedway
 Dedicated road course
 Temporary street circuit
NC Non-championship event

*The Detroit News Grand Prix was scheduled to be held on September 23, but postponed a day by rain.

Race results 

Indianapolis was USAC-sanctioned but counted towards the CART title.

Drivers points standings

Nation's Cup 
Best result in each race counts towards the nation's cup.

Driver Breakdown

See also
 1983–84 USAC Championship Car season
 1984 Indianapolis 500

References
 
 
 
 

Champ Car seasons
IndyCar